Saratov Electrical Components Production Association is a company based in Saratov, Russia.

The Saratov Electrical Components Production Association historically has produced aircraft products mostly for military use. In the early 1990s output of consumer durables, especially large-capacity refrigerators, expanded rapidly reducing the military share of output to less than 10 percent. The Saratov Electrical Components Production Association includes the Krasnokutskiy Electromechanical Plant located in Krasny Kut.

The plant produces the Saratov refrigerators since 1951, which were formerly well known across the Soviet bloc.

References

External links
 Official website

Manufacturing companies of Russia
Companies based in Saratov
Aircraft component manufacturers of the Soviet Union
Ministry of the Aviation Industry (Soviet Union)
Home appliance manufacturers of Russia
Aerospace companies of the Soviet Union
Manufacturing companies established in 1939
Manufacturing companies of the Soviet Union